Cowley is a town in Big Horn County, Wyoming, United States. The population was 655 at the 2010 census. In 2019 the US Census Bureau put that figure at 623.

Geography
Cowley is located at  (44.882684, -108.468193).

Demographics

2010 census
As of the census of 2010, there were 655 people, 229 households, and 169 families residing in the town. The racial makeup of the town was 95.4% White, 0.5% Native American, 0.9% Asian, 2.1% from other races, and 1.1% from two or more races. Hispanic or Latino of any race were 4.0% of the population.

There were 229 households, of which 37.1% had children under the age of 18 living with them, 63.8% were married couples living together, 7.4% had a female householder with no husband present, 2.6% had a male householder with no wife present, and 26.2% were non-families. 22.3% of all households were made up of individuals, and 12.6% had someone living alone who was 65 years of age or older. The average household size was 2.86 and the average family size was 3.41.

The median age in the town was 36.9 years. 31.8% of residents were under the age of 18; 7% were between the ages of 18 and 24; 22.3% were from 25 to 44; 23.9% were from 45 to 64; and 14.8% were 65 years of age or older. The gender makeup of the town was 49.3% male and 50.7% female.

2000 census
As of the census of 2000, there were 560 people, 200 households and 160 families residing in the town. The population density was 796.5 per square mile (308.9/km2). There were 223 housing units at an average density of 317.2 per square mile (123.0/km2). The racial makeup of the town was 97.32% White, 0.18% Asian, 2.14% from other races, and 0.36% from two or more races. Hispanic or Latino of any race were 3.39% of the population.

There were 200 households, of which 41.0% had children under the age of 18 living with them, 70.0% were married couples living together, 7.5% had a female householder with no husband present, and 20.0% were non-families. 18.5% of all households were made up of individuals, and 9.0% had someone living alone who was 65 years of age or older. The average household size was 2.80 and the average family size was 3.19.

In the city the population was spread out, with 31.1% of the population were under the age of 18, 9.3% from 18 to 24, 24.5% from 25 to 44, 22.1% from 45 to 64, and 13.0% who were 65 years of age or older. The median age was 34 years. For every 100 females, there were 97.9 males. For every 100 females age 18 and over, there were 96.9 males.

The median income for a household in the town was $38,750, and the median income for a family was $39,722. Males had a median income of $31,848 versus $20,000 for females. The per capita income for the town was $14,964. About 3.8% of families and 7.2% of the population were below the poverty line, including 10.3% of those under age 18 and 7.8% of those age 65 or over.

Government
The current mayor as of November, 2014 is local businessman Joel Peterson. Council members are David Banks, Dexter Woodis, Nick Sponsel and Scott Crosby. The town maintains an informational website at http://cowleywyoming.com/.

History
The community was named after Matthias F. Cowley, a leader in the Church of Jesus Christ of Latter Day Saints.

Education

Public education in the town of Cowley is provided by Big Horn County School District #1. High School students attend Rocky Mountain High School in Cowley. Middle School students attend Rocky Mountain Middle School also here in Cowley and Elementary students attend Rocky Mountain Elementary School in Cowley.

The Big Horn Academy Building, built in 1916, is located in Cowley. The building was home to Cowley High School from 1925 to 1983.

Big Horn Co. School District #1

Cowley Pioneer Day and the Cowley Pioneer Museum
Each July, Cowley hosts an annual celebration, known locally as "Cowley Pioneer Day", which is held on the Weekend closest to July 24, to commemorate the town's pioneer heritage. The celebration usually packs in a range of activities including a parade, pioneer heritage program, rodeo, dance, and town barbecue. Cowley's pioneer heritage is also remembered year-round in the Cowley Pioneer Museum, located on Main Street in Cowley, in the same building as the town hall. In addition to the town's official website, information on Cowley history, and Cowley people can be found on a website accessible through http://www.cowleywyoming.com. The website includes thousands of pictures, scans of high school yearbooks, memorial pages for Cowley people who have died, and other family history information.

See also

 List of municipalities in Wyoming

References

External links

 

Towns in Big Horn County, Wyoming
Towns in Wyoming
Populated places established in 1900